Rob Heinsoo (born 1964) is an American tabletop game designer. He has been designing and contributing to professional role-playing games, card games, and board games since 1994. Heinsoo was the lead designer on the 4th Edition of Dungeons & Dragons (2008), and is co-designer of the 13th Age roleplaying game along with Jonathan Tweet. He has also designed and contributed to role playing, miniatures and card games, and a computer game.

Career 
Heinsoo began playing Dungeons & Dragons in 1974 at age 10, using the original edition. His interest in games informed his interest in science fiction and fantasy, and vice versa. Heinsoo was hired by Jose Garcia for Daedalus Games to work on the RPG Nexus; some of his work for Daedalus Games' Feng Shui RPG was later published by Atlas Games. Chaosium hired Heinsoo in 1996 to oversee their licenses for Glorantha, but he was laid off the following year.

Heinsoo joined Wizards of the Coast (WotC) as part of the "D&D Worlds" team, where he focused on the third-edition version of Forgotten Realms. With WotC, Heinsoo was involved with a number of Dungeons & Dragons game products. Other Forgotten Realms works include the sourcebook Monsters of Faerûn. He also helped write the third edition Forgotten Realms Campaign Setting, which reached the top 50 of the non-fiction bestsellers in Canada in 2002 and won an Origins Award for best roleplaying supplement of 2001. He is the designer of Three-Dragon Ante, a card game.

While at Wizards of the Coast, he also led and contributed to various miniatures gaming projects. Heinsoo playtested the Chainmail game and so he became a member of the Chainmail team, and contributed to the Chainmail column in Dragon magazine writing about tactics and rules. Subsequent to the release of the Dungeons & Dragons Miniatures Game, he took over as lead designer on that project. He was also one of three designers of Dreamblade, for which he was nominated for an Origins Award in 2007.

Early in 2005, Bill Slavicsek organized a team to begin some early designs for a fourth edition of D&D, which was headed up by Heinsoo and also included Andy Collins and James Wyatt, with Heinsoo leading the teams working on the design and development in 2005 and 2006. The Player's Handbook for this edition was nominated for an Origins Award for Best Roleplaying Game in 2009. His teammates referred to his role on the 4th Edition team as the "mad genius". His book Monster Manual 2, co-written with Chris Sims, was a Wall Street Journal bestseller in 2009. Heinsoo was laid off by Wizards in 2009.

After Wizards, Heinsoo designed the 13th Age RPG. He designed 13th Age with Jonathan Tweet, the lead designer of 3rd Edition D&D. Heinsoo and Tweet are close friends who have played tabletop games together for years.

Rob Heinsoo also contributes to Alarums and Excursions.

Tabletop roleplaying games 
 Nexus: The Infinite City (1994) (Lead Editor, Writer)
 Back for Seconds (1996) (Co-Editor)
 Marked for Death (1996) (Co-Editor)
 Feng Shui: Hong Kong Action Movie Roleplay (1996) (Co-Editor)

3rd Edition D&D 
 Monsters of Faerun (2000) (Co-Designer)
 Forgotten Realms Campaign Setting (2001) (Co-Author)

4th Edition D&D 
 Dungeons and Dragons 4th Edition (2008) (Lead Designer)
 Player's Handbook (2008) (Lead Designer)
 D&D Essentials: Rules Compendium (2010) (Lead Designer)
 The Plane Above (2010) (Lead Designer)
 Underdark (2010) (Lead Designer)
 Primal Power (2009) (Designer)
 Adventurer's Vault 2 (2009) (Lead Designer)
 Monster Manual 2 (2009) (Lead Designer)
 Divine Power (2009) (Lead Designer)
 Forgotten Realms Player's Guide  (2008) (Lead Designer)
 Martial Power (2008) (Lead Designer)

 13th Age 
 13th Age 13 True Ways 13th Age Bestiary 13th Age Monthly 13th Age in Glorantha Card games and board games 
 Surviving On the Edge players' guide (1995) (Co-Author)
 Shadowfist trading card game (1995) (Lead Playtester, Editor)
 Netherworld (1996) (Developer, Additional Design)
 Shadowfist Player's Guide (1996) (Author)
 Flashpoint (1997) (Co-designer, Art Direction)
 Legend of the Five Rings Gold Edition (2000)  (Story Lead)
 Football Champions trading card game (2001–2004) (Designer, seven sets)
 Three-Dragon Ante card game (2005) (Designer)
 Inn-Fighting (2007) dice game (Designer)
 Castle Ravenloft (2010) (Additional Design)
 Three-Dragon Ante: Emperor's Gambit (2010) (Designer)
 Epic Spell Wars of the Battle Wizards: Duel at Mount Skullzfyre card game (2012) (Game Design)
 Night Eternal (2013) card game based on True Blood (Game Design)
 Shadowrun Crossfire (2014)
 Shadowrun Crossfire: High Caliber Ops (2015)
 Epic Spell Wars 2: Rumble at Castle Tentakil (2015)
 Legendary: Big Trouble in Little China (2016)
 Three-Dragon Ante: Legendary Edition (2019) (Designer)
 Wrestlenomicon (2020) (Co-Designer)

 Miniatures games 
 Chainmail (2002) (Co-Designer with Jonathan Tweet)
 Sets 1-4 (2002–2003) (Co-Designer, Developer with Jonathan Tweet)
 D&D Miniatures Sets 1-9, Harbinger, Dragoneye, Archfiends, Giants of Legend, Aberrations, Deathknell, Angelfire, Underdark, Wardrums (2003–2006) (Designer)
 Dungeons & Dragons Miniatures (2003) (Lead Designer)
 Dreamblade (2006) (Co-designer with Jonathan Tweet)

 Computer games 
 King of Dragon Pass'' (1999) (Lead Q&A, Additional Design, Manual)

References

External links 

Rob's Livejournal blog

Gamespy Interview
Critical Hits interview
Guys Lit Wire interview
 13th Age – My D & D Next: An interview with Rob Heinsoo, Jonathan Tweet and Lee Moyer, Obskures, December 17, 2012. Retrieved June 9, 2013.
Forbes interview about 13th Age (with Jonathan Tweet)

1964 births
20th-century American male writers
20th-century American writers
21st-century American writers
American fantasy writers
Atlas Games people
Chaosium game designers
Dungeons & Dragons game designers
Living people
Reed College alumni